"Nel blu, dipinto di blu" ('In the blue [sky] [as I was] painted blue' or 'In the blue-painted blue [sky]'), popularly known as "Volare" ('To fly'), is a song originally recorded by Italian singer-songwriter Domenico Modugno. Written by Modugno and Franco Migliacci, it was released as a single on 1 February 1958.

The song spent five non-consecutive weeks atop the Billboard Hot 100 in August and September 1958, and subsequently became Billboard's number-one single for the year. In 1959, at the 1st Annual Grammy Awards, Modugno's recording became the first ever Grammy winner for both Record of the Year and Song of the Year.

Winning the eighth Sanremo Music Festival, the song was chosen as the Italian entry to the Eurovision Song Contest in 1958, where it came in third place out of ten songs in total. The combined sales of all the versions of the song exceed 18 million copies worldwide, making it one of the all-time most popular songs to come out of Sanremo and Eurovision.

The song was later translated into several languages and recorded by a wide range of performers. The song is also used as the basis for numerous football chants.

Background and composition

Writing
Franco Migliacci began working on the lyrics of the song in June 1957, inspired by two paintings by Marc Chagall. He had planned to go to the sea with Domenico Modugno, but while waiting for Modugno to show up, Migliacci started drinking wine and eventually fell asleep. He had vivid dreams, and when he woke up, he looked at the Chagall paintings (reproductions) on the wall. In "Le coq rouge" was a yellow man suspended in midair, while in "Le peintre et la modelle", half the painter's face was coloured blue. So he began penning a song about a man who dreams of painting himself blue, and being able to fly.
Later that same night, Migliacci discussed his lyrics with Modugno, and for several days they worked on the song, tentatively entitled "Sogno in blu" ('Dream in blue').

In 2008, Modugno's widow, Franca Gandolfi, recalled that her husband, after a storm forced open his window, had the idea of modifying the chorus of the song, introducing the word "Volare", which is now the popular title of the song.

Musical style and lyrical content
The song is a ballad in a dramatic chanson style, in which Modugno describes the feeling he has when with his lover; a feeling that resembles flying. The song opens with a surreal prelude, which the cover versions often left out:

The English lyrics were written by Mitchell Parish. Alternative English lyrics were written in 1958 by Gracie Fields, and were used from then in most concerts she performed in until her death in 1979; she often changed the words to suit her performance and age.

Song contests

Sanremo Music Festival
In 1958, the song participated in the selection process for the eighth Sanremo Music Festival. The jury charged with selecting the entries to the competition was going to reject "Nel blu dipinto di blu"; however, in the end, it was one of the 20 admitted songs.

On 31 January 1958, the song was performed for the first time, during the second night of the Festival, by Domenico Modugno and Johnny Dorelli.
It was Dorelli's first appearance at the Festival, and according to his team-partner, Dorelli was so nervous that he had to be punched by Modugno to be persuaded to perform on stage.

After being admitted to the final, held at the Sanremo Casino on 1 February 1958, the song was performed again, winning the contest, beating the song "L'edera" by Nilla Pizzi and Tonina Torrielli, which came in second place.

While Dorelli's performance had little impact on the audience, Modugno's is now considered to be the event that changed the history of Italian music. During his performance, Modugno opened his arms as if he was going to fly, which would contribute to making it the most successful Sanremo Music Festival song. It would also mark a change in the way of performing, as Italian singers were used to standing with their arms on their chest, without moving on the stage.

Eurovision Song Contest

Following its first-place victory at the Sanremo Music Festival, the song was chosen to represent Italy at the Eurovision Song Contest 1958, which took place on 12 March in Hilversum, Netherlands. Domenico Modugno was chosen as the singer.

Modugno was set to open the show and perform in position 1, preceding the entry from Netherlands. However, he would have to perform again at the end as well—before the voting took place—due to a transmission fault during the first performance that caused the song to not be heard in all countries broadcasting the event. At the end of the voting, the song had received 13 points, placing 3rd in a field of 10. Despite this, it became one of the most successful songs ever performed in Eurovision Song Contest history.

It was succeeded as Italian entry at the 1959 contest by "Piove (Ciao, ciao bambina)", also performed by Modugno.

Commercial success
The song became an instant success in Italy, selling more than 20,000 copies in its first 12 days. As of February 2013, according to RAI's estimates, the single had sold 800,000 copies in its domestic market.
Following the results obtained in Italy, the song was also released in the United States and in the rest of Europe. In the United Kingdom, Modugno's single was released on 23 August 1958, together with eight other versions recorded by international artists. The single obtained global acclaim, becoming an international hit.

In the United States, the single debuted at number 54 on the very first Billboard Hot 100, on 4 August 1958, and the next week it climbed at number two, marking the biggest jump to the runner-up spot in the chart's history. On 18 August 1958, it topped the Hot 100, becoming the second song to reach the top spot on the chart, after Ricky Nelson's "Poor Little Fool". The song later completed a run of five non-consecutive weeks at the top of the chart, selling 2 million copies in the United States during 1958 and becoming Billboard's Song of the Year. "Nel blu dipinto di blu" was the first non-American, -Canadian or -British single to achieve this honor in the rock era, and it would be the only one to do so until 1994's "The Sign" by Swedish group Ace of Base. It is also one of the only two songs by Modugno charting on the Hot 100, together with "Piove (Ciao, ciao bambina)", which peaked at number 97.

In the United Kingdom, the single debuted at number 15 on 6 September 1958, and the following week it rose and peaked at number ten on the UK Singles Chart. It also peaked at number two on the Norwegian VG-lista Topp 20 Singles and on the Dutch Mega Single Top 100.

The song's popularity endures, and in 2004, according to the Italian Society of Authors and Publishers, it was the most played Italian song in Italy as well as in the whole world. Moreover, the combined sales of all the recorded versions of the song exceed 18 million units.

Awards and honors

Awards
During the 1st Grammy Awards, held on 4 May 1959 at Hollywood's Beverly Hilton Hotel, "Nel blu dipinto di blu" received two awards: for Record of the Year and for Song of the Year. The song is the only foreign-language recording to achieve this honor, and it is the only song competing in the Eurovision Song Contest to receive a Grammy Award.

In 2001, seven years after his death, Modugno was awarded with the Sanremo Music Festival Special Award, "given to the one who,...in 1958, with 'Nel blu dipinto di blu', turned the Sanremo Music Festival in a stage of worldwide relevance." During 2008's Sanremo Music Festival, lyricist Franco Migliacci and Modugno's widow, Franca Gandolfi, received the special Award for Creativity for the song, presented by Italian Society of Authors and Publishers' chairman Giorgio Assumma.

Honors
In 2005, a concert was held in Copenhagen, Denmark, to celebrate the 50th anniversary of the Eurovision Song Contest. During the event, "Nel blu dipinto di blu" was ranked second on the list of the "all time favourite songs of the Eurovision Song Contest," behind ABBA's "Waterloo". ABBA member Benny Andersson, while receiving the prize, commented:

In 2008, the 50th anniversary of the song was celebrated in Italy by releasing a postage stamp showing a man who is flying on a blue background.
During the 2010 Viña del Mar International Song Festival, the song, performed by Italian singer Simona Galeandro, was also declared the most popular song of the 20th century, winning the international competition of the contest.

Plagiarism allegation
Immediately after the release of "Nel blu dipinto di blu", Antonio De Marco accused Domenico Modugno and lyricist Franco Migliacci of plagiarising his 1956 song "Il castello dei sogni". Though the song was not released, it had been played during some concerts in the previous years. During the trial for plagiarism, De Marco claimed that he lost his sheet music in Rome while registering his song with the Italian Society of Authors and Publishers, suggesting that Modugno somehow found it and plagiarised both the lyrics and the music of his composition. However, the Rome court of justice absolved Modugno and Migliacci, following the opinion of an expert who claimed that the two songs don't have any relevant similarity.

As a response, Modugno sued De Marco for defamation, and in July 1958 De Marco was convicted by the Milan court of justice.

Track listings

Credits and personnel

 Franco Migliacci – songwriter
 Domenico Modugno – vocals, songwriter
 Alberto Semprini – orchestra conductor
 Sestetto Azzurro – musicians
 Walter Beduschi – bass
 Bruno De Filippi – guitar
 Pupo De Luca – drums
 Ebe Mautino – harp
 Mario Migliardi – Hammond organ
 Alberto Semprini – piano
Credits adapted from Discografia Nazionale della Canzone Italiana.

Charts

Domenico Modugno version

All-time charts

Dalida version

Recorded cover versions

Dean Martin recorded a version which alternates between the original Italian lyrics (Martin spoke fluent Italian) and English lyrics adapted by Mitchell Parish. Martin's version appeared on his LP This Is Dean Martin! (1958). Martin's song, titled "Volare (Nel blu dipinto di blu)", was also released as a single, reaching number two on the UK Singles Chart, peaking at number three in Norway, number fifteen on the Billboard Hot 100, and number 27 in Canada. A version by Umberto Marcato also made a brief appearance on the Canadian charts at number 20 on August 4, 1958.

In the United Kingdom, Italian musician Marino Marini's cover peaked at number thirteen in October, and Charlie Drake's version reached number 28. The McGuire Sisters' version, also released as a single, peaked at number 80 on the Billboard Hot 100 in the US, and entered the Norwegian Singles Chart at number seven.

In 1960, the song was recorded by Italian-American singer Bobby Rydell, reaching number four on the Hot 100 during the summer of 1960, number 22 in the UK, and number three in Canada.

There was an instrumental version by Ray Conniff on his album The Happy Beat, released in 1963.

Another charting version of the song was released in 1975 by American jazz singer Al Martino, and included in his album To the Door of the Sun. His single peaked at number 33 in the US, reached number 3 on the Dutch Single Top 100, and reached number 31 in the Canadian AC charts in December 1975, being certified gold by the Canadian Recording Industry Association.

In 1989, Gipsy Kings recorded an up-tempo rumba flamenca version of the song, with lyrics partly in Italian and partly in Spanish. Their version topped the Billboard Hot Latin Songs chart in April 1990 and reached number 86 in the UK chart. It also charted in France and the Netherlands, peaking at number 16 and at number 26 respectively.

In February 2010, a cover of the song performed by Italian singer Simona Galeandro won the international competition of the 2010 Viña del Mar International Song Festival.

One year later, a version of the song performed by Emma Marrone was included in the soundtrack of the Italian movie Benvenuti al Nord, directed by Luca Miniero. Marrone's cover reached number 70 on the Italian Singles Chart.

See also
List of number-one singles in Australia during the 1950s
List of Hot 100 number-one singles of 1958 (U.S.)
List of number-one Billboard Hot Latin Tracks of 1990

References

External links
 Volare, storia di una canzone 

Italian songs
Italian-language songs
Songs written by Domenico Modugno
1950s ballads
1958 songs
1958 singles
1960 singles
Eurovision songs of 1958
Eurovision songs of Italy
Congratulations Eurovision songs
The McGuire Sisters songs
Dean Martin songs
Bobby Rydell songs
Gipsy Kings songs
Billboard Hot 100 number-one singles
Cashbox number-one singles
Number-one singles in Australia
Grammy Award for Record of the Year
Grammy Award for Song of the Year
Songs with lyrics by Mitchell Parish
Songs with lyrics by Franco Migliacci
Sanremo Music Festival songs
Songs involved in plagiarism controversies
Decca Records singles
Pop ballads